Hugh Mulcahy (19 June 1894 – 1 October 1965) was an Australian rules footballer who played with Richmond in the Victorian Football League (VFL).

Notes

External links 

1894 births
1965 deaths
Australian rules footballers from Melbourne
Richmond Football Club players
People from Kensington, Victoria